State Route 207 (SR 207) is a  route that serves as a connection between U.S. Route 72 (US 72) in Rogersville in Lauderdale County and the Tennessee state line. After crossing the state line, it becomes Tennessee State Route 11 (SR 11).

Route description
The southern terminus of SR 207 is located at its intersection with US 72 opposite CR 91 in southern Rogersville.  From this point, the route travels in a northerly direction towards Anderson. From Anderson, the route turns to the northeast before resuming a more northerly track after its junction with SR 99 as it enters Tennessee.

Major intersections

References

207
Transportation in Lauderdale County, Alabama